Jeanne Morgenthaler (1885–1974) was a Swiss fencer. She competed in the women's individual foil at the 1924 and 1928 Summer Olympics.

References

External links
 

1885 births
1974 deaths
Swiss female foil fencers
Olympic fencers of Switzerland
Fencers at the 1924 Summer Olympics
Fencers at the 1928 Summer Olympics